Rennes 2 University (UR2) is a public university located in Upper Brittany, France. It is one of the four universities in the Academy of Rennes.
The main campus is situated in the northwest section of Rennes in the Villejean neighborhood not far from the other campus, located at La Harpe.

History

Creation of the University of Brittany
Asked by Francis II, Duke of Brittany, the Pope created the first university of Brittany in Nantes in 1460. It taught arts, medicine, law, and theology. In 1728, the mayor of Nantes, Gérard Mellier, asked that the university be moved to Rennes, Nantes being more trade oriented. The Law school was thus moved to Rennes in 1730. This city already had the Parliament of Brittany, so it was more suited to have this school. In 1793 the national government closed all universities in France. It was not before 1806 that the Law school reopened in Rennes.

Development of the faculties in Rennes

In 1808, Napoleon I reorganized the universities in France, creating the University of France. From the 2 original cities housing the University of Brittany, only Rennes was included in this University. Nantes had to wait until 1970 to have its university again. In 1810 a faculty of letters opened, which gathered in 1835 five schools (French literature, foreign literature, antic literature, history, and philosophy). The science faculty opened still in Rennes in 1840. Those 3 faculties remained without clear boundaries between them until 1885 with the creation of a "Conseil des facultés" which took in 1896 the name of University of Rennes. In the middle of the 19th century, they were gathered in the Palais Universitaire, located currently in the Quai Émile Zola, but were then scattered downtown. The Faculty of Letters was thus relocated in 1909 to the Séminaire, located currently in the Place Hoche.

Creation of Rennes 2 University

In 1967, the Villejean campus opened, dedicated to Arts, Letters, and Human Sciences.

In 1969, in order to enforce the growth of French universities, a law was passed, splitting the University of Rennes into two new entities. This new university took the name of 'University of Upper Brittany'. The Villejean neighborhood was then still in development, building housing facilities for students, along with other university facilities.

In the east of the city, Beaulieu includes sciences and philosophy. In the west, Villejean includes Schools of Foreign Languages, Arts, Human Sciences and Social Sciences. Rennes I University's School of Medicine, is located on the edge of Villejean campus, but also on Brittany's largest hospital center, Pontchaillou.

Since March 2002, Villejean campus can be reached with the VAL subway, via the station 'Villejean-Université', making the university only 5 minutes away from the inner city.

The two universities are currently working on their unification. If this project were to be accomplished, the brand new university, with its 40,000 students, would be one of the largest in France.

in 2015, the Robert-Poirier Stadium was inaugurated on the Villejean campus.

List of former presidents

Academic programs

The university is structured around 5 UFRs, or Units of teaching and research. This organization based on UFR is common to all public universities in France.

 The UFR of Sports (APS), ;
 1 department: STAPS
 1 research unit.
 The UFR of Arts, Letters, Communication (ALC):
 5 departments (Plastic arts, Performing arts, History of art, Literature and Music) ;
 4 research units.
 The UFR of foreign Languages
 11 departments: German, English, Arabic, Breton and Celtic languages, Chinese, Spanish, Italian, LEA (Applicated Foreign Languages, students study 2 languages and a few economic notions), Multi-langues, Portuguese and Russian. 21 different foreign languages are being taught in those departements, from beginner to advanced level.
 4 research units, including one belonging to the CNRS,
 1 Center for non-student teachings: Le Centre de Langues,
 1 institut: L'Institut des Amériques de Rennes (IDA), the American Studies institute.
 The UFR of Human Science:
 3 departments: Psychology / Teaching Sciences / Sociology, Language and Communication,
 4 research units.
 1 formation center : Cefocop
 1 institute: Institut de criminologie et Sciences Humaines (ICSH)
 The UFR of Social sciences:
 4 departments: Administration économique et sociale (AES), Geography space amenagement, History, and Mathematics applied to Social sciences (MASS),
 6 research units, including 5 belonging to the CNRS.
 2 institutes: L'Institut des Amériques de Rennes (IDA), the American Studies institut, and the  "Institut de formation et de recherche sur l'administration territoriale" (IFRAT)

Campus life

Student organizations
With its 50 or so student circles, Rennes 2 University has the highest rate of organizations per student among French universities. There is a radio station, Radio Campus Rennes, for which the EREVE was built in 2005. Most of the organizations are located throughout different buildings on campus.

Festivals
Different festivals are organized by the students, some of them were large enough to enlarge their fields to the city itself. Among them:
"K-barré", focusing on performing arts
"Roulements de tambour", focusing on music
"Travelling", focusing on cinema, now a Citywide festival.
"Tubas d'or", focusing on short movies

People

Alumni
 Louis Le Pensec (1937), Minister of Agriculture, Senator, Member of Parlement
 Marylise Lebranchu, Minister of Justice
 Jean-Yves Le Drian, Minister of Defense
 Bernard Bonnejean (1950), writer
 Étienne Daho (1957), singer
 Hélène Delavault
 Muriel Laporte (1963), lead singer of Niagara, rock band
 Gustave Parking (1955),
 Christophe Honoré (1992), movie maker, movie writer, writer
 Gaël Roblin (2006),

Faculty

 Anne F. Garréta (1962), writer, prix Médicis 2002
 Jean Delumeau (1923), historian, elected to the Académie française, 27 September 1989.
 Dominique Fernandez (1929), writer, prix Médicis 1974, Prix Goncourt 1982, elected to the Académie française, 8 March 2007.
 Henri Fréville, Senator, Member of Parlement, Mayor of Rennes
 Milan Kundera (1929), writer, prix Médicis 1973
 Jean-Yves Le Drian (1947), Member of Parlement, Governor of the Brittany Region
 Jean-Claude Maleval, writer, psychoanalyst, professor of psychopathology
 Robert Merle (1908), writer, prix Goncourt 1949
 Juan José Saer (1937), writer, Premio Nadal 1986
 Mário Soares (1924), President of Portugal.

Popular culture
In the film Brocéliande (2003) by Doug Headline, the story is set on campus, even if the only recognizable element is the 2001–2002 orange student ID card.

See also
 List of public universities in France by academy

Notes

External links

Education in Rennes
Educational institutions established in 1969
1969 establishments in France
Universities and colleges in Rennes
Universities in Brittany